German submarine U-1165 was a Type VIIC/41 U-boat built for Nazi Germany's Kriegsmarine for service during World War II.
She was laid down on 31 December 1942 by Danziger Werft, Danzig as yard number 137, launched on 20 July 1943 and commissioned on 17 November 1943 under Oberleutnant zur See Hans Homann.

Design
Like all Type VIIC/41 U-boats, U-1165 had a displacement of  when at the surface and  while submerged.

U-1165 was fitted with five  torpedo tubes (four fitted at the bow and one at the stern), fourteen torpedoes or 26 TMA or TMB Naval mines, one  SK C/35 naval gun, (220 rounds), one  Flak M42 and two  C/30 anti-aircraft guns. Its complement was between forty-four and sixty.

Armament

FLAK weaponry
U-1165 was mounted with two 2cm Flak C38 in a M 43U Zwilling mount with short folding shield on the upper Wintergarten. The M 43U mount was used on a number of U-boats (and ).

Service history
The boat's service career began on 17 November 1943 with the 8th Training Flotilla, followed by active service with 9th Flotilla on 1 June 1944, followed by 11th Flotilla on 1 August 1944. U-1165 took part in no wolfpacks. U-1165 surrendered on 9 May 1945 at Narvik, Norway. She was transferred to Loch Eriboll, Scotland on 19 May 1945.

Summary of raiding history

See also
 Battle of the Atlantic

References

Notes

Citations

Bibliography

German Type VIIC/41 submarines
U-boats commissioned in 1943
World War II submarines of Germany
1943 ships
World War II shipwrecks in the Atlantic Ocean
Ships built in Danzig
Operation Deadlight
Maritime incidents in December 1945